Växjö-Kronoberg Airport , branded as Växjö Småland Airport, is an airport in Kronoberg county, Sweden.
The airport is owned by Kronoberg county and Växjö municipality. A small share is held by Alvesta municipality.

History
Scheduled aviation from Växjö started around 1960 from Uråsa airbase, 20 km south of Växjö. A larger airport was needed, so it was built at its present location in 1975.

Traffic went mainly to Stockholm from the start. After 2007, international traffic greatly increased with low price airlines like Ryanair and Wizzair. Charter flights to Southern Europe and the Canary Islands have also increased. 

In April 2020, the Stockholm route was cancelled due to the COVID-19 pandemic, but was restarted in August 2021. The alternative route to Stockholm is by train (3½ hours) or a flight from Kalmar, the nearest airport with regular flights to Stockholm. In 2023 New routes to Umeå with Braathens Regional Airlines Also a flight route to Malaga with Norwegian Air Shuttle will begin.

Airlines and destinations
The following airlines operate regular scheduled and charter flights at Växjö-Kronoberg Airport:

Statistics

See also
List of the busiest airports in the Nordic countries

References

External links

Växjö-Kronoberg Airport

Airports in Sweden
Växjö
Buildings and structures in Kronoberg County
International airports in Sweden